Nayib-e Lajehi (also Romanized as Nāyīb-e Lajeh’ī) is a village in Jahanabad Rural District, in the Central District of Hirmand County, Sistan and Baluchestan Province, Iran. At the 2006 census, its population was 184, in 33 families.

References 

Populated places in Hirmand County